Gabriel de Mussis (ca. 1280 – ca. 1356) — in Italian, Gabriele de' Mussi — was a notary from Piacenza, Italy, who gave a vivid account of the start of the Black Death in the Black Sea city of Kaffa and its spread to Sicily and Piacenza. His account in Latin, entitled Istoria de Morbo sive Mortalitate quae fuit Anno Dni MCCCXLVIII ("History of the Disease, or the Great Dying that took place in the Year of our Lord 1348"), is preserved in a manuscript in the library of the University of Wroclaw (now shelfmark R 262).

Although it was formerly believed that de Mussis had been present in Kaffa and travelled in a disease-laden ship to Piacenza, it has been determined that he probably never left home. Modern authorities believe that his description of events is plausible and may indicate that plague was successfully introduced into Kaffa by the Tartars, but that the long-standing belief that the events at Kaffa contributed to the spread of plague beyond the city is not correct.

References

Citations

Other sources
Deaux, George (1969), The Black Death 1347. New York: Weybright and Talley; Chapter IV, pp. 75ff.
Derbes, Vincent J. (April 4, 1966), “De Mussis and the Great Plague of 1348”, JAMA. 1966; 196(1):59-62. doi:10.1001/jama.1966.03100140113030.

14th-century Italian historians
14th-century Latin writers
People from Piacenza
Year of birth uncertain